Dmitriy Nikolayevich Mamonov (born 26 April 1978) is a Kazakhstani football manager and a former player. He is the conditioning coach of FC Novosibirsk.

Honours
Kairat
Kazakhstan Cup winner: 2001

References

External links
 

1978 births
Living people
Kazakhstani footballers
FC Zhetysu players
FC Sibir Novosibirsk players
Kazakhstani expatriate footballers
Expatriate footballers in Russia
FC Kairat players
Kazakhstan international footballers
FC Vostok players
FC Aktobe players
FC Atyrau players
Kazakhstan Premier League players
Kazakhstani football managers
Kazakhstani expatriate football managers
Expatriate football managers in Russia
Place of birth missing (living people)
Association football midfielders